The State Duma of the Federal Assembly of the Russian Federation of the 8th convocation is the current convocation of the lower house of Russian parliament.

The composition of the 8th State Duma was determined based on the results of the 2021 legislative election. Elections were held using a mixed system: 225 deputies were elected on party lists and 225 — in single-member constituencies. Of the 14 parties that participated in the elections, only 5 were able to overcome the 5% barrier. And for the first time since 1999, more than four parties were able to form their own factions. Three more parties and five independent candidates were able to win one seat each through single-mandate constituencies.

In accordance with the presidential decree, the first meeting of the 8th State Duma was held on 12 October 2021.

Leadership

The leadership of the State Duma where elected at the first meeting.

In accordance with the Constitution, the oldest deputy opens the first session. However, for the first time ever, the second oldest deputy opened the first meeting. This was because the oldest deputy, 85-year-old Vladimir Resin, refused to open the meeting and therefore this duty was passed to 84-year-old Valentina Tereshkova. In addition to Tereshkova, as per tradition, the presidium was also attended by the oldest deputies from each faction.

Chairman election
On 25 September 2021, during a meeting with the leaders of the parties elected to the State Duma, President Vladimir Putin expressed his support for the Chairman of the State Duma of the previous convocation Vyacheslav Volodin. Putin said that Volodin was worthy of becoming chairman again, but would leave the final decision to the deputies of the State Duma. After that, United Russia nominated Volodin for the position. Since United Russia has a majority in the State Duma, this means that Volodin will be elected speaker without the support of other parties. Nevertheless, the Liberal Democratic Party and A Just Russia — For Truth also endorsed Volodin.

The Communist Party refused to support Volodin and announced its intention to nominate its own candidate for the Chairman. The Communists named Dmitry Novikov, Leonid Kalashnikov and Yury Afonin as possible candidates. On 7 October it was officially announced that the Communist Party would nominate Dmitry Novikov for Chairman of the State Duma.

The New People party did not nominate a candidate, but also did not publicly endorse any candidate.

Factions
Five parties were able to overcome the 5% barrier in the elections and form their own factions. Candidates from three more parties were able to win in their constituencies, but they will not be able to form factions, since their parties did not pass the electoral barrier. They may to join the factions of other parties, or became unaffiliated deputies. Two of them joined the Liberal Democratic Party. Also, independent deputies were elected in five constituencies, who could also became unaffiliated, but joined the factions of political parties. Two deputies joined United Russia, two more joined New People and one joined A Just Russia — For Truth.

Membership

Vacant seats

Committees and commissions

Committees
In the 8th convocation, the number of committees was increased from 26 to 32. According to Vyacheslav Volodin, the increase in committees is due to the expanded powers of the parliament during the constitutional reform. Since the State Duma approves the members of the government, it was decided to create committees based on the profile of line federal ministries, agencies and services.

On 8 October 2021, during the meeting of the provisional working group on the preparation of the first plenary session, the composition of the committees and their leadership were approved.

Commissions

Major legislation

First session
 November 24, 2021: Federal Budget for 2022 passed with 337 votes in favor.
 December 14, 2021: Federal Law "On the General Principles of the Organization of Public Authority in the Subjects of the Russian Federation" (Law on Regional Authorities) passed with 330 votes in favor.

Second session
 February 22, 2022: Treaty of Friendship, Cooperation and Mutual Assistance between Russia and the Donetsk People's Republic ratified with 400 votes in favor.
 February 22, 2022: Treaty of Friendship, Cooperation and Mutual Assistance between Russia and the Luhansk People's Republic ratified with 399 votes in favor.

Third session
 October 3, 2022: Treaty between the Russian Federation and the Donetsk People's Republic on the admission of the Donetsk People's Republic to the Russian Federation and the formation of a new federal subject of the Russian Federation ratified with 413 votes in favor.
 October 3, 2022: Federal Constitutional Law "On the admission of the Donetsk People's Republic to the Russian Federation and the formation of a new federal subject of the Russian Federation – the Donetsk People's Republic" passed with 413 votes in favor.
 October 3, 2022: Treaty between the Russian Federation and the Luhansk People's Republic on the admission of the Luhansk People's Republic to the Russian Federation and the formation of a new federal subject of the Russian Federation ratified with 412 votes in favor.
 October 3, 2022: Federal Constitutional Law "On the admission of the Luhansk People's Republic to the Russian Federation and the formation of a new federal subject of the Russian Federation – the Luhansk People's Republic" passed with 413 votes in favor.
 October 3, 2022: Treaty between the Russian Federation and Zaporozhye Oblast on the admission of Zaporozhye Oblast to the Russian Federation and the formation of a new federal subject of the Russian Federation ratified with 409 votes in favor.
 October 3, 2022: Federal Constitutional Law "On the admission of Zaporozhye Oblast to the Russian Federation and the formation of a new federal subject of the Russian Federation – the Zaporozhye Oblast" passed with 410 votes in favor.
 October 3, 2022: Treaty between the Russian Federation and Kherson Oblast on the admission of Kherson Oblast to the Russian Federation and the formation of a new federal subject of the Russian Federation ratified with 411 votes in favor.
 October 3, 2022: Federal Constitutional Law "On the admission of Kherson to the Russian Federation and the formation of a new federal subject of the Russian Federation – the Kherson" passed with 411 votes in favor.
 November 24, 2022: Federal Budget for 2023 passed with 320 votes in favor.
 November 14, 2021: Federal Law on Amendments to the Federal Law "On Information, Information Technologies and Information Protection" and Certain Legislative Acts of the Russian Federation" (regarding the prohibition of propaganda of non-traditional sexual relations and (or) preferences) passed with 397 votes in favor.

Major appointments

Cabinet
 July 15, 2022: Denis Manturov approved as Deputy Prime Minister of Russia with 394 votes in favor.

Non-cabinet
 April 21, 2022: Elvira Nabiullina re-approved as Governor of the Central Bank of Russia with 338 votes in favor.

Major events

October 12, 2021: Opening of the 8th State Duma.
January 20, 2022: Iranian President Ebrahim Raisi addressed a session of the State Duma.
November 22, 2022: Cuban President Miguel Díaz-Canel addressed a session of the State Duma.

References 

Convocations of the Russian State Duma
8th State Duma of the Russian Federation
2021 establishments in Russia
State Duma of Russia